Visage Painting and the Human Face in 20th Century Art was a major international overview of painting and the face held in 2000 at the National Museum of Western Art in Tokyo and at the National Museum of Modern Art, Kyoto, curated by National Museum of Modern Art, Tokyo.

It included works by:

Subjects
This exhibition presented works by 45 artists from the dawn of the 20th century to the present.

References
A catalogue was published by the National Museum of Modern Art, Tokyo in 2000

External links
ArtFacts.net

Art exhibitions in Japan
Portrait art
2000 in Japan
2000 in art